It All Started from an Intro is the fourth studio album by Taiwanese Mandopop singer-songwriter William Wei. It was released digitally on August 16, 2016 and physically on August 18, 2016 by Linfair Records. The album consists of 11 tracks and 5 bonus tracks.

Wei merges technology and music in his fourth album. The album features a QR code as its cover, designed by Red Dot Design Award winner David Lai (賴佳韋) and Golden Pin Design Award winner Wei Chia Lu (呂瑋嘉). By scanning the QR code cover with the VisionLens app, a "virtual William Wei" 3D model will appear and interact with its listeners.

Track listing

Music videos

References

2016 albums
William Wei albums